Hypsidia grisea is a moth in the family Drepanidae. It was described by Malcolm J. Scoble and Edward David Edwards in 1988. It is found in Australia.

References

Moths described in 1988
Thyatirinae